You Can't Teach An Old Dog New Tricks is the fifth studio album by Seasick Steve. It was released on May 30, 2011, on  Play It Again Sam.  The album features former Led Zeppelin bass guitarist John Paul Jones. It peaked at number 6 on the UK Albums Chart and number 18 on the Irish Albums Chart.

In 2012, it was awarded a diamond certification from the Independent Music Companies Association which indicated sales of at least 200,000 copies throughout Europe.

Track listing
All songs written by Seasick Steve except "Whiskey Ballad" by Paul Martin Wold.

Personnel
According to the official CD liner notes.

Seasick Steve – vocals, guitar, banjo
John Paul Jones – bass guitar on "You Can' Teach an Old Dog new Tricks..." and "Back in the Doghouse"; mandolin on "Long Long Way"
Dan Magnusson – percussion on "You Can' Teach an Old Dog new Tricks...", "Burnin' Up", "I Don't Know Why She Love Me But She Do", "Back in the Doghouse", "Party", "Days Gone" and "It's a Long Long Way"
Paul Martin Wold – washboard, backing vocals and whistling on "Whiskey Ballad"
Georgina Leach – fiddle on "Treasures" and "Long Long Way"
The Lyndhurst Rabble Choir – "It's a Long Long Way"

Charts
You Can't Teach an Old Dog New Tricks was the second biggest-selling blues album of 2011 in the UK, with sales of 131,000 copies.

Weekly charts

Year-end charts

Certifications

Release history

Changes to band
John Paul Jones performed with Seasick Steve and his drummer Dan Magnusson on the British television show Later... with Jools Holland. It was later confirmed on the show that he had appeared on the album.

References

External links
Official website

2011 albums
Seasick Steve albums
PIAS Recordings albums